Kallanai (also known as the Grand Anicut) is an ancient dam built by Karikala of Chola dynasty in 150 CE. It is built (in running water) across the Kaveri river flowing from Tiruchirapalli District to Thanjavur district, Tamil Nadu, India. The dam located in Thanjavur
 district. Located at a distance of 15 km from Tiruchirapalli, 45 km from Tanjavur. It is the fourth oldest water diversion or water-regulator structures in the world and the oldest in India that is still in use. Because of its spectacular architecture, it is one of the prime tourist spots in Tamil Nadu.

History
It is located on the river in Trichy district, exactly 14 km from the city of Tiruchirappalli and 45 km from the city of Thanjavur. The idea behind the construction of the dam was to divert the river to the delta districts thereby boosting irrigation. This dam was re-modeled by the British during the 19th century. In 1804, Captain Caldwell, a military engineer, was appointed by the British to make a study on the Kaveri river and promote irrigation for the delta region. He found that a large amount of water passed onto the Kollidam leaving behind a small volume for irrigation purposes. Following this, Major Sim proposed the idea of undersluices across the river with outlets leading to the Kollidam River (Coleroon) thus preventing formation of silt. The Lower Anaicut built by Sir Arthur Cotton in the 19th century across Coleroon, the major tributary of Cauvery is said to be a replicated structure of Kallanai.

Geography
The two rivers form the island of Srirangam before joining at Kallanai. The northern channel is called the Kollidam (Coleroon); the other retains the name Kaveri, and empties into the Bay of Bengal at Poompuhar. On the seaward face of its delta are the seaports of Nagapattinam and Karaikal.

Description
The purpose of the Kallanai was to divert the waters of the Kaveri across the fertile delta region for irrigation via canals and to its northern delta branch Kollidam/Coleroon. Downstream of the barrage, the river Kaveri splits into four streams known as Kollidam Aru, Kaveri, Vennaru and Puthu Aru. However, the flood waters can be allowed, by opening the barrage/anaicut gates, to pass through the other three delta branches also to join the sea. The dam is still in excellent condition, and supplied a model to later engineers, including Sir Arthur Cotton's 19th-century dam across the Kollidam, the major distributary of the Kaveri. By the early 20th century, the irrigated area had been increased to about one million acres (400,000 ha).

The delta farmers of Tamil Nadu have demanded the Tamil Nadu government to honor Karikala Cholan, who built this dam.

Gallery

See also
 Tamil language
 Tamil literature
 Sangam period
 Lemuria

References

Bibliography

Further reading

Buildings and structures completed in the 1st century
Dams in Tamil Nadu
Chola Empire
Dams on the Kaveri River
Buildings and structures in Tiruchirappalli
Multiple-arch dams
Chola architecture
Tourist attractions in Tiruchirappalli
Water Heritage Sites in India